Stepan Ryabchenko (born October 17, 1987) is a Ukrainian new media artist. His work includes digital art, conceptual architecture, sculpture, graphics and light installations. In his artwork, the artist creates his own digital universe with its heroes and mythology. Known for his monumental prints, sculptures and video-art installations of non-existent characters, including Virtual Flowers, Electronic Winds, Computer Viruses, etc.

Biography 

Stepan Ryabchenko was born on October 17, 1987, in Odessa, in a family of artists. His father, Vasiliy Ryabchenko, is one of the key figures in contemporary Ukrainian art, and the New Ukrainian Wave; Stepan's grandfather, Sergey Ryabchenko, was a Soviet and Ukrainian graphic artist.

Ryabchenko graduated from the Odessa State Academy of Civil Engineering and Architecture in 2011 with a master's degree in Architecture.

From 2020, Stepan Ryabchenko is the chief curator of the Art Laboratory creative organization.

In 2020, the artist represented Ukraine at the International Changwon Sculpture Biennale in South Korea.

In 2021, he was included in the list of the best digital artists in the world. In the same year represented Ukraine at the Expo 2020 in Dubai.

Lives and works in Odessa.

Work

Stepan Ryabchenko uses a broad range of computer software and digital technologies to create large-scale digital prints, animations, sculptures, light installations, and videos representing his own digital universe, populated with fictional characters, surrealistic plant and animal forms, and visualizations of computer viruses. His futuristic visual language, which moves between abstract and figurative forms, explores our relationship to virtual spaces and the natural environment.

Exhibitions
Stepan Ryabchenko's works have been exhibited at the Ludwig Museum in Budapest, Saatchi Gallery in London, Krolikarnia in Warsaw, Museum of Contemporary Art in Zagreb, Danubiana Meulensteen Art Museum in Bratislava, Art Centre Silkeborg Bad in Silkeborg, Manege and Gostiny Dvor in Moscow, Ars Electronica, etc. His works have also been exhibited in many places in Ukraine, including PinchukArtCentre, Mystetskyi Arsenal, National Art Museum, Odessa Museum of Western and Eastern Art, National Cultural Center "Ukrainian House", M17 Contemporary Art Center, Modern Art Research Institute, etc.

Collections

Public collections 

 Art Collection Telekom, Berlin, Germany 
 Danubiana Meulensteen Art Museum, Bratislava, Slovakia
 M17 Contemporary Art Center, Kyiv, Ukraine
 Odessa Fine Art Museum, Odessa, Ukraine
 Museum of Odessa Modern Art, Odessa, Ukraine
 Cherkasy Regional Art Museum, Cherkasy, Ukraine
 Museum of Contemporary Ukrainian Art Korsakiv, Lutsk, Ukraine

References

1987 births
Living people
Artists from Odesa
20th-century Ukrainian male artists
21st-century Ukrainian male artists
Ukrainian contemporary artists
Digital artists
New media artists
Light artists
Installation artists
Contemporary sculptors